Ibn Abdun may refer to
Abd al-Majid ibn Abdun, poet 
Muhammad ibn Abdun al-Jabali, physician, mathematician
Muhammad ibn Ahmad ibn Abdun, legal scholar, author of  Risala fi-l-qada wa-l-muhtasib